Chad Solomon (born 23 February 1994) is a South African rugby union player for the  in Super Rugby and  in the Currie Cup and in the Rugby Challenge. His regular position is hooker.

Rugby career

2007–2012 : Schoolboy rugby

Solomon was born in Bellville. He represented his local  provincial union since primary school level, when he played at the Under-13 Craven Week tournament held in Krugersdorp in 2007. He progressed through the youth ranks, playing for Western Province at the Under-16 Grant Khomo Week in 2010 and at the premier high schools rugby union competition in South Africa, the Under-18 Craven Week, in both 2011 and 2012, scoring a try for Western Province in their match against the Blue Bulls in the latter tournament.

He was selected in a South Africa Schools team after the 2012 Craven Week and featured in all three matches in the Under-18 International Series held between South Africa and their counterparts from France, Wales and England.

2013–2015 : Youth, Varsity Cup and Vodacom Cup rugby

Solomon joined the  academy after school, and made eleven appearances for the  side in the 2013 Under-19 Provincial Championship.

The team won five of their seven matches during the regular season to finish in second place on the log. Solomon was an unused replacement as his side beat Western Cape rivals  20–8 in the semi-final He came on for the final eight minutes of the final against  in Potchefstroom, where he was part of a comeback that saw UCT fight back from 33–15 down with five minutes to go to score a 39–33 victory, to win the competition for the second time.

He was intermittently used by  during the 2014 Under-21 Provincial Championship, making six appearances during the regular season, starting three of those. His side finished top of the log, winning eleven of their twelve matches, and progressed to the final, where they lost to the s.

Solomon started their semi-final against  in Bloemfontein and scored one of two tries in the match, but it proved to be futile, with the home team winning 21–10. At the conclusion of the competition, Solomon was included in a Varsity Cup Dream Team that played in a match against the South Africa Under-20 team.

He was also the first choice for the s during the 2015 Under-21 Provincial Championship, starting eleven of their fourteen matches, coming on as a replacement in one more match. He scored a try in a 51–22 victory over the s as Western Province clinched top spot on the log.

2016–present : Western Province

He made ten starts and three appearances off the bench in Western Province's fourteen matches, of which they won thirteen to top the log.

He made his Currie Cup debut by coming on for the final 25 minutes of a 26–45 defeat. However, Solomon suffered an ankle injury during the match and was ruled out for the remainder of the season.

References

1994 births
Living people
Cape Coloureds
Rugby union hookers
Rugby union players from Bellville, South Africa
South African rugby union players
Southern Kings players
Stormers players
Western Province (rugby union) players